Darlene Tompkins (November 16, 1940 – July 18, 2019) was an American actress.

Biography
She was born in Chicago, Illinois on November 6,1940. Her birth name was Darlene Perfect, but her parents were divorced when she reached the age of five and she took the surname of her stepfather. Her family performed in plays and vaudeville, and she had an early goal to be a Hollywood actress. At the age of twelve she was mauled by a dog which left her very self-conscious. To help overcome her shyness, she was entered into a beauty contest by her mother. Her subsequent beauty pageant victories attracted some attention and she appeared in commercials.

Her first acting role was in Beyond the Time Barrier (1960). She then co-starred opposite Elvis Presley in Blue Hawaii (1961). She had a role in My Six Loves (1963) and played parts in several television shows.

Her career was interrupted by a marriage and the birth of two sons. She tried to resume acting again when the marriage ended in the mid-1970s, but by then she was in her thirties and had difficulty landing roles. Since then she worked as a stand-in and stuntwoman and remarried.

Tompkins died on July 18, 2019 following complications of a stroke and was taken off life support.

Filmography

References

External links

1940 births
2019 deaths
20th-century American actresses
People from Chicago
Place of death missing
21st-century American women